Vermilion was a provincial electoral district in Alberta, Canada, mandated to return a single member to the Legislative Assembly of Alberta from 1905 to 1971.

History

Vermilion was one of the original 25 electoral districts contested in the 1905 Alberta general election upon Alberta joining Confederation in September 1905. In the 1970 electoral district re-distribution, the Vermilion electoral district would be abolished and would be reformed as Vermilion-Viking, the boundaries for the new district would be a continuation of the Vermilion boundaries as adjusted prior to the 1963 Alberta general election.

Members of the Legislative Assembly (MLAs)
Matthew McCauley was elected as the first member for the Vermilion district, he had previously served as the first Mayor of Edmonton and member of the Legislative Assembly of the Northwest Territories for the Edmonton electoral district. McCauley's time in the Alberta Legislature was limited to less than a year when he resigned his seat in 1906 after his appointment to be Warden of the Edmonton Penitentiary, the first of its kind in Alberta.

Election results

1905 general election
The Returning Officer for the 1905 election was Thomas J. Cunningham.

1906 by-election

1909 general election

1910 by-election

1913 general election

1917 general election

1917 by-election

1921 general election

1921 by-election

1926 general election

1930 general election

1935 general election

1940 general election

1944 general election

1948 general election

1952 general election

1955 general election

1959 general election

1963 general election

1967 general election

Plebiscite results

1957 liquor plebiscite

On October 30, 1957 a stand-alone plebiscite was held province wide in all 50 of the then current provincial electoral districts in Alberta. The government decided to consult Alberta voters to decide on liquor sales and mixed drinking after a divisive debate in the Legislature. The plebiscite was intended to deal with the growing demand for reforming antiquated liquor control laws.

The plebiscite was conducted in two parts. Question A asked in all districts, asked the voters if the sale of liquor should be expanded in Alberta, while Question B asked in a handful of districts within the corporate limits of Calgary and Edmonton asked if men and woman were allowed to drink together in establishments.

Province wide Question A of the plebiscite passed in 33 of the 50 districts while Question B passed in all five districts. Vermilion voted in favour of the proposal with a slight majority. Voter turnout in the district was very low, falling well under the province-wide average of 46%.

Official district returns were released to the public on December 31, 1957. The Social Credit government in power at the time did not considered the results binding. However the results of the vote led the government to repeal all existing liquor legislation and introduce an entirely new Liquor Act.

Municipal districts lying inside electoral districts that voted against the Plebiscite were designated Local Option Zones by the Alberta Liquor Control Board and considered effective dry zones, business owners that wanted a license had to petition for a binding municipal plebiscite in order to be granted a license.

See also
List of Alberta provincial electoral districts
Vermilion, Alberta, a town in central Alberta

References

Further reading

External links
Elections Alberta
The Legislative Assembly of Alberta

Former provincial electoral districts of Alberta